Lago di Nicito was a lake in the Province of Catania, Sicily, Italy.

It formed in 406 BC when part of the course of the river  became blocked following an eruption of Etna, and had a circumference of around 6 km with a depth of around 15m. Then, in 1669, a second massive eruption of Etna, and one of the most devastating in history filled the lake up.

It received its name from Nike as the lake was renowned for its quality of boat racing.

Lakes of Sicily